Monintown is a townland in County Westmeath, Ireland.

Monintown spans the border of two civil parishes. It is one of 14 townlands of the civil parish of Multyfarnham and 11 townlands of the civil parish of Stonehall both in the barony of Corkaree in the Province of Leinster.
 
The neighbouring townlands are: Ballinriddera to the north–west and Knockbody and Stonehall to the south.

In the 1911 census of Ireland there were 7 houses and 34 inhabitants in the townland. The 2011 census recorded 19 inhabitants.

References

External links
Map of Monintown at openstreetmap.org
Monintown at the IreAtlas Townland Data Base
Monintown at Townlands.ie
Monintown at The Placenames Database of Ireland

Townlands of County Westmeath